Giggi il Bullo is a 1982 Italian commedia sexy all'italiana film directed by Marino Girolami.

Cast 

Alvaro Vitali: Giggi
Adriana Russo: Adriana
Marcello Furgiuele: Peppe
Susanna Fassetta: Raffaella
Ennio Girolami: Ennio
Gianfranco Barra: An Officer
Diana Dei: A Lady
Venantino Venantini: Don Salvatore
Cinzia De Carolis : Marietta the young prostitute from Venice
Stefano Onofri : Ucelletto

References

External links

Italian sex comedy films
Films directed by Marino Girolami
1980s Italian-language films
1980s Italian films